Belmez (10 January 1987 – 18 October 1999) was an American-bred, British-trained Thoroughbred racehorse best known for winning the 1990 King George VI and Queen Elizabeth Stakes as a three-year-old.

Background

Belmez was a medium-sized, strongly-built bay colt, with a prominent white stripe and a white sock on his off-fore leg. He was bred by Sheikh Mohammed's Darley Stud in the US, a product of the second crop of foals sired by El Gran Senor. He was trained throughout his career by Henry Cecil and ridden in most of his starts by Steve Cauthen.

Racing career

Belmez began his racing career with an upset, winning the Carlsberg Stakes at Newmarket in November 1989 as an unconsidered 50-1 outsider.
By the time he re-appeared as a three-year-old in the Burghclere Stakes in April 1990, his reputation preceded him, and he won "comfortably" by four lengths at odds of 4–5. Belmez was then moved up in class for the Chester Vase and defeated Quest for Fame by a length to become favourite for the Derby. An injury ruled Belmez out of the Derby which was won easily by Quest For Fame. Belmez returned with a third place to the filly Salsabil in the Irish Derby (with Quest For Fame fifth) and was then aimed at the King George VI and Queen Elizabeth Stakes.

Steve Cauthen, who had ridden Belmez in his previous four races chose to partner Old Vic, with the ride on Belmez going to Mick Kinane. Such was the quality of the entry, that Belmez was the only three-year-old in the field, but he produced a career-best effort, moving up to contest the lead early in the straight and prevailing by a neck from his stablemate Old Vic, with top-class performers like Assatis, Cacoethes, In The Wings, Sapience, Terimon and Legal Case among the also-rans.

A month later Belmez won the Great Voltigeur Stakes, getting up on the line to beat the future St Leger winner Snurge by a short-head. He finished fifth behind Saumarez in the Prix de l'Arc de Triomphe and seventh behind Better Loosen Up in the Japan Cup before being retired to stud.

Assessment
Belmez was given a rating of 132 by the Racing Post.

Stud career
Belmez was retired initially to stand at the Queens stud in Norfolk, England but was later transferred to Haras du Pin in Normandy. He made little impact as a stallion, but he did sire one important winner in Caramba, winner of the Falmouth Stakes and Nassau Stakes. He is the damsire of the Racing Post Trophy winner Kingsbarns.

Pedigree

References

1987 racehorse births
1999 racehorse deaths
Racehorses bred in Kentucky
Racehorses trained in the United Kingdom
Thoroughbred family 16-b
King George VI and Queen Elizabeth Stakes winners